Karima Medjeded is a blind French judoka.

She was the first person to win a gold medal at the 2004 Summer Paralympics in Athens, when she competed in the women's extra-lightweight category in judo. Medjeded defeated three consecutive opponents by ippon, including Brazil's Karla Cardoso in the final.

She was subsequently awarded a knighthood in the Légion d'honneur, the highest decoration in France, by French President Jacques Chirac.

At the 2008 Summer Paralympics in Beijing, she competed in the women's 48 kg weightclass and finished tied for seventh place.

Medjeded lives in Bordeaux.

References

External links 
 

Living people
French female judoka
Paralympic judoka of France
Judoka at the 2004 Summer Paralympics
Judoka at the 2008 Summer Paralympics
Paralympic gold medalists for France
Chevaliers of the Légion d'honneur
Year of birth missing (living people)
Medalists at the 2004 Summer Paralympics
Paralympic medalists in judo
20th-century French women
21st-century French women